Robert Shaw (May 22, 1921 – April 10, 2011) was an American football player and coach.

Early life
Shaw lettered three times each in football, basketball and track at Fremont Ross High School. He was first-team All-Ohio in both football and basketball and won the shot put and discus in the state track and field meet. At Ohio State University, he lettered twice in football. Playing right end, on both offense and defense, Shaw was part of the Buckeyes' first NCAA National Championship team in 1942 and was named a first-team All American for that season. He also lettered in basketball and track, helping the Buckeyes to their first Western Conference track crown in 1942. Shaw was inducted into Ohio State University Athletic Hall of Fame in 1996.

He served with the 104th Infantry Division in the European Theater during World War II, and he was subsequently awarded a Bronze Star Medal. He later completed his bachelor's degree in education at Otterbein College.

Pro football career
Shaw began his National Football League career began in 1945 when he joined the Cleveland Rams. He played as an end. The Rams won the Championship in his rookie year. In the off-season, he played for the Toledo Jeeps of the National Basketball League.

He played for the Cleveland/Los Angeles Rams (1945–1949) and the Chicago Cardinals (1950). He was the NFL leader in receiving touchdowns with 12 in 1950 and was the first player to catch five touchdowns in a game. He played two seasons for the Calgary Stampeders, winning the Dave Dryburgh Memorial Trophy in 1951 and 1952. After his release by Calgary, he signed with the Toronto Argonauts in late September 1953 on the strength of his place-kicking.

After his retirement, Shaw served as an assistant coach with the Baltimore Colts, and San Francisco 49ers before becoming head coach of the New Mexico Military Institute in 1960. In three seasons at NMMI, Shaw had a 22–6–1 record. He later moved to the Canadian Football League where he coached the Saskatchewan Roughriders to a 16–14–2 record over two seasons and the Toronto Argonauts to an 8–20 record from 1965 to 1966.  In 1976, he won the Annis Stukus Trophy (coach of the year) while with the Hamilton Tiger-Cats.

He lived in Cooksville during his time coaching the Argos.

Personal life and death
Shaw died April 10, 2011 at his home in Westerville, Ohio, after a brief illness at the age of 89. He was predeceased by his wife of 63 years, Mary Garr.

Head coaching record

College

References

External links
 

1921 births
2011 deaths
American football ends
American players of Canadian football
Baltimore Colts coaches
Buffalo Bills coaches
Chicago Bears coaches
Chicago Cardinals players
Cleveland Allmen Transfers players
Cleveland Rams players
Calgary Stampeders players
Hamilton Tiger-Cats coaches
Hamilton Tiger-Cats general managers
Los Angeles Rams players
New Orleans Saints coaches
Ohio State Buckeyes football players
Otterbein Cardinals football coaches
San Francisco 49ers coaches
Toledo Jeeps players
Youngstown Bears players
Eastern Conference Pro Bowl players
United States Army personnel of World War II
Otterbein University alumni
People from Richwood, Ohio
Players of American football from Ohio